"What Would Your Memories Do" is a song written by Dean Dillon and Hank Cochran, and recorded by American country music artist Vern Gosdin.  It was released in July 1984 as the second single from his album There Is a Season.  The song peaked at number 10 on the Billboard Hot Country Singles chart.

An unreleased version of the song was recorded by George Strait in the 1980s. The version was later included on the 1995 box-set, Strait Out of the Box.

Chart performance

References

1984 singles
Vern Gosdin songs
George Strait songs
Songs written by Hank Cochran
Songs written by Dean Dillon
1984 songs